Linda Gray is a Republican State Senator in Arizona.

Gray was born in St. Charles, Missouri and educated at the University of Northern Colorado.

Gray was first elected to the Arizona State Senate in 2004.

Sources
Gray's senate bio
Vote Smart bio of Gray

1939 births
Republican Party Arizona state senators
University of Northern Colorado alumni
Living people
Place of birth missing (living people)